David Baikie is a Scottish former football player who has since moved into management.

As a player Baikie spent his entire career in junior football and also cut his managerial teeth there.

Arbroath
His began management in the Scottish Football League with Arbroath F.C. in 1997. He led the club from bottom of the Third Division to promotion, before resigning over a lack of funding in 2000.

Tayport
Baikie returned to the junior ranks to manage Tayport.

Cowdenbeath 
He returned to the Scottish Football League in 2004 as manager of Cowdenbeath. He lost his job the following year, however, when he was charged with an assault outside a bar in Dundee.

East Fife
Baikie was appointed manager of East Fife in 2006 during a turbulent period in the club's history. Despite this led the side to the Scottish Third Division championship the next season. The club stabilised under his leadership and Baikie won a manager of the month award during the 2008-09 season. However, in April 2009 the club announced the resignation of Baikie as manager.

Linlithgow Rose
Baikie subsequently took charge of Scottish Junior Football East Region Super League club Linlithgow Rose and led them to their 2010 Scottish Junior Cup final victory.

Linlithgow Rose sacked boss David Baikie after they lost to Bonnyrigg. Baikie, who only 18 months ago led the club to Scottish Cup glory, was forced out the door with assistants Graeme Irons and Derek Carr.

Managerial honours

Arbroath
 Scottish Third Division: promotion 1997–98

East Fife
 Fife Cup : 2007-08
 Scottish Third Division: 2007–08

Linlithgow Rose
 Scottish Junior Cup: 2009–10

References

Scottish football managers
Arbroath F.C. managers
Cowdenbeath F.C. managers
East Fife F.C. managers
Scottish footballers
Scottish Junior Football Association players
Scottish Football League managers
1953 births
Living people
Association footballers not categorized by position
Tayport F.C. managers
Linlithgow Rose F.C. managers
Scottish Junior Football Association managers